Dry Creek is a stream in Catoosa County and Whitfield County, Georgia, in the United States.

Dry Creek was named from the fact it runs dry in times of drought.

See also
List of rivers of Georgia (U.S. state)

References

Rivers of Catoosa County, Georgia
Rivers of Whitfield County, Georgia
Rivers of Georgia (U.S. state)